Lushes Bight–Beaumont–Beaumont North is a town on Long Island in Notre Dame Bay in the Canadian province of Newfoundland and Labrador. The town had a population of 169 at the 2021 Census, down from 275 in the 2006 Census.

The community is inaccessible by road and is serviced by a ferry via Pilley's Island.

The local school, Long Island Academy, closed in 2016.

Demographics 

See also
 List of cities and towns in Newfoundland and Labrador
 Newfoundland outport

References

Towns in Newfoundland and Labrador
Road-inaccessible communities of Newfoundland and Labrador